William or Bill Alexander may refer to:

Literature
William Alexander (poet) (1808–1875), American poet and author
William Alexander (journalist and author) (1826–1894), Scottish journalist and author
William Alexander (author) (born 1976), American children's writer
William Alexander, Baron Alexander of Potterhill (1905–1993), English educator and author
Fred Alexander (editor) (William Frederick Alexander, 1882–1957), New Zealand subeditor, poetry anthologist and newspaper editor
William Menzies Alexander (1858–1929), Scottish medical and theological writer

Military
William Alexander (Canadian soldier) (1880–1917), World War I soldier executed for desertion
William Melville Alexander (1897–1988), Canadian World War I flying ace
William Alexander, Lord Stirling (1726–1783), American Revolutionary War soldier

Politics
Bill Alexander (politician) (1910–2000), British communist activist, commander of the International Brigade's British Battalion
William Alexander (died 1446), MP for Salisbury and Wiltshire
William Alexander (Australian politician) (1844–1924), member of the Western Australian Legislative Council
William Alexander (Lord Provost) (1690–1761), MP for Edinburgh and Lord Provost of Edinburgh 1754–1756
William Alexander (Glasgow MP) (1874–1954), MP for Glasgow Central
William Vollie Alexander Jr. (born 1934), American politician; former US Representative from Arkansas
William B. Alexander (1921–2006), member of the Mississippi State Senate 
Willem-Alexander of the Netherlands  (born 1967), King of the Netherlands
William Melville Alexander (Illinois politician), Speaker of the Illinois House of Representatives

Religion
 William Alexander (Quaker) (1768–1841) English Quaker and publisher
 William Alexander (bishop) (1824–1911), Anglican bishop, Primate of All Ireland
 William Lindsay Alexander (1808–1884), Scottish church leader
 William Patterson Alexander (1805–1884), American missionary in Hawaii

Sports
William Alexander (American football) (1889–1950), football coach at Georgia Tech
Bill Alexander (Canadian football) (1924–1997), Canadian football halfback
William Alexander (rugby union) (1874–1937), Wales international rugby union player

Visual arts
Bill Alexander (painter) (1915–1997), East-Prussian artist, star of The Magic of Oil Painting
William Alexander (painter) (1767–1816), British artist

Characters
William Alexander (Hollyoaks), a fictional character in British soap opera Hollyoaks
William Alexander (Honorverse), a fictional character in the Honorverse

Others
Bill Alexander (engineer) (William Hector, 1927–1995), British avionics engineer
William Alexander, 1st Earl of Stirling (c. 1567–1640), British colonial organizer
William Alexander (the younger) (c. 1602–1638), founder of the colony at Port Royal; son of the 1st Earl of Stirling
William Alexander (judge) (c. 1754–1842), Lord Chief Baron of the Exchequer
Sir William Alexander, 3rd Baronet (1797–1873), Attorney-General of the Duchy of Cornwall
William C. Alexander (1848–1937), cofounder of Pi Kappa Alpha Fraternity
William Cowper Alexander (1806–1874), president of the New Jersey State Senate and president of the Equitable Life Assurance Society
William D. Alexander (1916–1991), American film producer
William DeWitt Alexander (1833–1913), educator in Hawaii
William Hastings Alexander (died 1876), Hong Kong judiciary officer
Bill Alexander (director) (born 1948), American theatre director

See also
Willie Alexander (born 1943), American singer
Willie Alexander (American football) (born 1949), former professional American football player
Will Alexander (disambiguation)
Alexander (disambiguation)
William (disambiguation)
Alexander Williams (disambiguation)